Beth McCarthy-Miller (born September 3, 1963) is an American television director. Shows she has directed include Saturday Night Live and 30 Rock.

Early life 
McCarthy-Miller was born on September 3, 1963, in Elizabeth, New Jersey.  She attended the University of Maryland, where she was a DJ and majored in radio, television and film. While in college she interned at CNN and MTV.

Career 
McCarthy-Miller worked as a line producer's assistant and assistant director at MTV and began directing in 1988. During her nine years with MTV, she worked on MTV Unplugged with Nirvana, Neil Young, Elton John, Tony Bennett, and k.d. lang. She worked for The Week in Rock and later The Jon Stewart Show.

She was the director of NBC's Saturday Night Live for eleven years. She left SNL in 2006 at the end of season 31, replaced as director by Don Roy King. She became a director for Viacom's MTV again in 2003 when she directed the MTV Video Music Awards.

She currently works through her own companies, Catalyst Entertainment and McBeth Productions as a director and producer.

Director
30 Rock
Abby's
Adele Live in New York City
America: A Tribute to Heroes
black-ish
Bob Hearts Abishola
Brooklyn Nine-Nine
Californication
Call Me Kat
The Colin Quinn Show
Community
Dave Attell: Captain Miserable
Eagles: Hell Freezes Over
Go On
The Good Place
Great News
Important Things with Demetri Martin
In the Motherhood
The Jon Stewart Show
Shania Twain: Up! Live in Chicago
2008, 2009, 2010, 2011 Kids' Choice Awards
Happy Endings
House of Lies
The Kominsky Method
LA to Vegas
Lip Sync Battle
Mad Love
Man Up!
The Marriage Ref
Marry Me
Match Game (2016 version)
The Maya Rudolph Show
The Mindy Project
Modern Family
Mr. Sunshine
MTV Unplugged
1996–1999, 2001–2003, 2005 MTV Video Music Awards
Night of Too Many Stars: An Overbooked Event for Autism Education
Nirvana: Live And Loud
The Oprah Winfrey Show
Parks and Recreation
People Magazine Awards
Samantha Who?
Saturday Night Live
The Sound of Music Live!
Super Bowl 35 & 38 half-time shows
Taina
Trophy Wife
Unbreakable Kimmy Schmidt
Up All Night
Veep
Work It
Young Sheldon

Awards and nominations

References

External links

Wake Forest University profile: Beth McCarthy

1963 births
American television directors
American women television producers
American women television directors
Living people
Directors Guild of America Award winners
Artists from Elizabeth, New Jersey
Television producers from New Jersey
21st-century American women